Al salir de clase is a Spanish teen drama television series produced by BocaBoca. The 1,199-episode-long broadcasting run on Telecinco spanned from September 1997 to July 2002.

Premise 
The fiction, set in the Madrilenian Instituto Siete Robles, deals with the mishaps of a group of teenagers, including relationships, accidents, revenges, deaths, beatings, drugs, divorces, kidnappings, breakups and the bullying from the so-called "banda del bate".

Cast

Production and release 
The series was produced by BocaBoca.
The pilot premiered on 8 September 2017. The broadcasting run comprised 5 seasons, with 1,199 episodes featuring a running time of 25 minutes aired on a Monday to Friday basis. The series was brought to an end on 12 July 2002. Starting with bad audience figures in the opening episode (1.5 million viewers), ratings progressively went up to a peak of 3.6 million viewers. The series became one of the pioneer shows regarding LGBTI representation in Spanish fiction and the gay character performed by Alejo Sauras earned appraisal from the LGBTI community at the time.

Awards and nominations 

|-
| align = "center" | 2001 || 48th Ondas Awards || colspan = "2" | Best TV Series ||  || 
|}

References 

1997 Spanish television series debuts
2002 Spanish television series endings
1990s Spanish drama television series
2000s Spanish drama television series
Spanish teen drama television series
Telecinco network series
1990s teen drama television series
2000s teen drama television series
Spanish-language television shows
Television series about teenagers
Television shows set in Madrid
Spanish television soap operas
Spanish LGBT-related television shows
Television series by BocaBoca